Caviana Meridional, the Ilha Caviana Meridional, is a river island belonging to the Marajó Archipelago, it is located opposite the north coast of Marajó Island in the delta lowlands at the mouth of the Amazon in the state of Pará, Brazil. The island forms part of the low-lying marajó várzea, the inundated land in and around the mouth of the Amazon River. The island is an excellent place to observe the tidal bore called the pororoca,  where the Amazon river waters meet the incoming Atlantic tides and form a standing wave, and is a birdwatchers' haven.

External links

River islands of Brazil
Islands of the Amazon
Landforms of Pará